The list of shipwrecks in 2007 includes ships sunk, foundered, grounded, or otherwise lost during 2007.

January

7 January

10 January

12 January

19 January

26 January

28 January

30 January

February

1 February

3 February

10 February

20 February

25 February

28 February

March

7 March

8 March

13 March

18 March

April

6 April

10 April

12 April

18 April

24 April

25 April

26 April

May

14 May

17 May

25 May

Unknown date

June

8 June

23 June

25 June

28 June

July

2 July

14 July

August

3 August

3 August

5 August

7 August

12 August

13 August

14 August

17 August

20 August

23 August

30 August

September

2 September

10 September

11 September

24 September

October

7 October

November

3 November

8 November

12 November
11 ships sank or ran aground in the Black Sea due to the weather conditions:

17 November

23 November

26 November

27 November

December

7 December

10 December

19 December

25 December

References
 

2007
 
Ship